Planet Perfecto was a dance supergroup, formed in 1997 by Paul Oakenfold, Ian Masterson and Jake Williams.  They were signed to Oakenfold's record label, Perfecto Records.

Musical career
Their first release was "Georgie Girl" on 12" vinyl in 1997; the single did not make it into the UK Singles Chart.  However, their next track, "Not Over Yet '99", was more successful entering the UK chart at #16 in August 1999.  They worked with a fourth producer, Matt Darey on the track, a remix/re-edit of "Not Over Yet" by Grace to create the track, which was to be the first of four hits for the group. Oakenfold had previously been a member of Grace.

Before forming Planet Perfecto, all three producers had made their names in the dance music scene under different guises.  Most notably Jake Williams as JX and Masterson with Flexifinger.  Paul Oakenfold was often viewed as being the main force behind "Planet Perfecto", but this is probably because he was more of a household name, having been successful as a DJ and having hits under numerous guises. Planet Perfecto have not released any further material since 2001.  All three producers have undertaken independent projects since that time.

Discography

Singles

References

English electronic music groups
English techno music groups
British trance music groups
British supergroups
Electronic music supergroups